Harvey Taylor could refer to: 

Harvey L. Taylor, American educator from Utah
M. Harvey Taylor, American politician from Pennsylvania